is a Japanese equestrian rider.

Biography
He competed in the 1964 Summer Olympics, finishing 40th in show jumping. Hoketsu also qualified for the 1988 Summer Olympics, but was unable to compete when his horse was quarantined.

At the 2008 Summer Olympics on August 13, 2008, he finished 9th in the Dressage Team Grand Prix and 35th in the Dressage Individual Grand Prix.  In 2012, at the age of 70, Hoketsu won a berth for Japanese representation for the 2012 Summer Olympics in individual dressage and in competition of equestrian at the 2012 Summer Olympics – Individual dressage he finished 40th.

In his 70s, the 1968 graduate of Duke University is regarded as the "hope for old men". He was the oldest athlete in the 2008 and 2012 Summer Olympics. Hoketsu is the oldest Olympian to ever compete for Japan, and is the third oldest Olympian to compete ever, next to shooter Oscar Swahn of Sweden, who won a silver in the 1920 Summer Olympics and Arthur von Pongracz, who competed at age 72 in Dressage in 1936 Summer Olympics in Berlin.

References

External links
 

Equestrians at the 1964 Summer Olympics
Equestrians at the 2008 Summer Olympics
Dressage riders
Show jumping riders
Living people
1941 births
Japanese male equestrians
Olympic equestrians of Japan
Equestrians at the 2012 Summer Olympics
Asian Games medalists in equestrian
Equestrians at the 1986 Asian Games
Asian Games silver medalists for Japan
Medalists at the 1986 Asian Games
Japanese dressage riders